The Kouga Local Municipality is located in the Eastern Cape of South Africa, approximately 80 km west of Port Elizabeth, and forms part of the Sarah Baartman District Municipality. Its territory includes the coastal zone between the Van Stadens River in the east and the Tsitsikamma River in the west, and stretches inland towards the Baviaanskloof Mountains in the north.

Regional access to the area is obtained via the N2 National Route from Port Elizabeth to Cape Town. It is often regarded as the cleanest municipality in the Eastern Cape.

Topography and climate

The municipality is characterised by 3 main topographical regions:

 The coastal region stretches from the Van Stadens River in the east through the Tsitsikamma River in the west.  This zone includes the towns of Jeffreys Bay, St Francis Bay, and Oyster Bay. The coast serves as a major national and regional tourism attraction.
 The Gamtoos River Valley is characterised by wide, fertile flood plains associated with low-lying land, with steep less-fertile slopes flanking the Valley.  The towns of Hankey and Patensie, Loerie and Thornhill are focal points of this high-potential agricultural region.
 The Humansdorp and Kruisfontein area is characterised by moderate slopes in the south, with steeper slopes towards the north and northwest.

The four main rivers in the area – the Kromme, Seekoei, Kabeljouws and Gamtoos – are all tidal rivers.  The Kromme River and Gamtoos River are significant sources of water supply.  Ground water forms another major component of domestic water supply for towns in the Kouga region, especially Humansdorp, Jeffreys Bay, St Francis Bay, Cape St Francis and Oyster Bay.  Aquifers are also utilised in the agricultural sector for irrigation of pastures.

There are numerous areas of wetland adjacent to the region's rivers and on the coastal platform.  These wetlands are extremely sensitive to disturbances such as agricultural activities and development.  The wetlands accommodate high species diversity, and fulfil natural water purification and flood retention roles.

The climate of the Kouga region is subtropical, which makes the area conducive to a range of outdoor
activities and various types of agricultural production.  Rainfall varies between 650 mm per year
(St Francis Bay area) to 400 mm (Gamtoos River Valley).   The area is generally described as windy.

Towns and settlements
More than 70% of the population of the Kouga region lives in urban areas. Humansdorp, with over 24,000 residents, has an established infrastructure and acts as a regional service centre, supplying the surrounding agricultural communities and the coastal towns with commodities and services. Commercial and industrial activities of the region are centred in Humansdorp.

The coastal towns of Jeffreys Bay, St Francis Bay, Cape St Francis and Oyster Bay
are well-established tourist destinations.  Jeffreys Bay has a population of over 40,000 with an annual population growth rate of 2.5% or higher, making it one of the fastest-growing towns in South Africa.

The urban areas of Hankey and Patensie, situated in the Gamtoos River Valley, provide important services to the surrounding high-density agriculture industry.

Other settlements in the Kouga region include: Andrieskraal, Aston Bay, Centerton, Gamtoos Mouth, Kruisfontein, Kwanomzamo, Loerie, Ocean View, Oyster Bay, Paradise Beach, Pellsrus, Ramaphoza Village, Sea Vista, Thornhill, Tokyo Sexwale, Umzamowethu and Weston.

Politics

The municipal council consists of thirty members elected by mixed-member proportional representation. Fifteen councillors are elected by first-past-the-post voting in fifteen wards, while the remaining fifteen are chosen from party lists so that the total number of party representatives is proportional to the number of votes received.

History
Kouga Local Municipality was formed at the time of the municipal elections in December 2000, by the merger of the earlier councils of Humansdorp, Jeffrey's Bay, Hankey, Oyster Bay, Patensie and St Francis Bay. The Democratic Alliance (DA), at the time a joint project of the New National Party (NNP) and the Democratic Party (DP), took power after the first local elections.

The NNP withdrew from the DA in 2001 to instead align with its old rival, the African National Congress (ANC). During the floor crossing period in 2002, one DA councillor defected to the NNP, allowing an ANC-NNP coalition to take over governance of the municipality. Kouga remained under ANC control for the next 14 years, with the party winning a comfortable victory in 2006 and narrowly retaining power after a closely fought election in 2011.

In the election of 3 August 2016, however, the DA won a majority of seventeen seats on the council, defeating the ANC, which previously controlled the council. Elza van Lingen became the new mayor of the municipality. She died in April 2018, after which speaker Horatio Hendricks took over as mayor.

The following table shows the results of the 2021 municipal election.

Main places
The 2001 census divided the municipality into the following main places:

Notes

References
 Official website
 Official Tourism website
 Integrated Development Plan (2007–2012). Kouga Local Municipality. Retrieved on 5 October 2009.

External links
 Official website